Turkey Lacrosse Association (TLA) is a non-profit organization formed to educate and disseminate information on the sport of lacrosse in Turkey and globally.  The association also provides financial support for the sport in Turkey, including funding and managing Turkey's national teams.

Represented by TLA, Turkey is the first predominantly Muslim country to play lacrosse competitively and to be a member of the Federation of International Lacrosse and the European Lacrosse Federation.

Men's national field team
In 2014, in the team's first appearance at the World Lacrosse Championships, Turkey placed 22nd.

Men's national indoor team
In 2015, in its first appearance at the World Indoor Lacrosse Championships. Turkey placed 10th.

References

External links
Official website
Turkey lacrosse on Twitter
Television appearance of Turkey's national lacrosse team on NTV Spor TV, September 5, 2010.
"Turkey's Lacrosse on SportsTV Sport Center", August 21, 2014.

2009 establishments in Turkey
Sports organizations of Turkey
Sports organizations established in 2009
Lacrosse in Turkey
Lacrosse governing bodies in Asia
Lacrosse governing bodies in Europe